The 525th Fighter Squadron is a United States Air Force unit. It is assigned to the 3d Operations Group at Joint Base Elmendorf–Richardson, Alaska.  The squadron was first activated as the 309th Bombardment Squadron in February 1942.  After training in the United States, it deployed to the Mediterranean Theater of Operations, where it became the 525th Fighter-Bomber Squadron and engaged in combat until the spring of 1945, earning two Distinguished Unit Citations.  After VE Day, the squadron became part of the occupation forces in Germany.  Briefly inactivated in 1946, it returned to Germany a few months later.

During the Cold War, the squadron served in the fighter bomber role as the 525th Fighter-Bomber Squadron and in the air defense role as the 525th Fighter-Interceptor Squadron.  It became the 525th Tactical Fighter Squadron in 1969.  The squadron again saw combat service in the Gulf War before inactivating in March 1992.

The squadron was reactivated in its current location in September 2007.

Mission
The combat-ready fighter squadron is prepared for rapid worldwide deployment of a squadron of Lockheed Martin F-22A Raptor aircraft to accomplish precision engagement of surface targets using a wide variety of conventional air-to-surface munitions. The 525th trains in the fighter missions of strategic attack, interdiction, offensive counterair (air-to-surface), suppression of enemy air defenses, as well as offensive and defensive counterair (air-to-air).

History

World War II
The 525th Fighter Squadron originally activated during World War II as the 309th Bombardment Squadron (Light) on 10 February 1942, to support Allied Forces in the European Theater of Operations. The squadron began training for operations at Will Rogers Field, Oklahoma, and was assigned to the 86th Bombardment Group.

In August 1942, the squadron transferred to Key Field, Mississippi, to start flight training in the Douglas A-20 Havoc. A month later, the squadron was redesignated the 309th Bombardment Squadron (Dive). By year's end, the squadron started the transition to two new combat aircraft types, the Vultee A-31 Vengeance and the North American A-36 Apache. The squadron achieved combat ready status on 19 March 1943.

Twelve days after its departure from the United States, the squadron landed at La Senia Airfield, Algeria. The 309th moved to Mediouna Airfield, French Morocco, on 15 May 1943; Marnia Airfield, French Morocco, on 3 June 1943; and to Tafaraoui Airfield, Algeria on 11 June 1943. This is where the squadron acquired its first combat experience on 6 July 1943. On the squadron's first day of combat, it struck enemy entrenchments in Sicily, softening enemy resistance for General George S. Patton's invading Seventh Army. Following the invasion, the 309th Bombardment Squadron set up its operations in Gela Airfield, Sicily, on 20 July 1943, and to Barcellona Landing Ground, Sicily, on 27 July 1943, to support the Allied campaign against the West Coast of Italy.

The 309th Bombardment Squadron was redesignated the 525th Fighter-Bomber Squadron on 23 August 1943. While in Italy, the 525th moved several more times while participating in the Rome-Arno campaign. Bases for the 525th included Sele Airfield, Serretella Airfield, and Pomigliano Airfield in 1943. During 1944, the squadron operated from Marcianise Airfield, Ciampino Airport, Orbetello Airfield, Grosseto Airfield, Italy and Poretta Airfield, Corsica. Two of the more famous battles during the Italian campaigns were Salerno and the Battle of Monte Cassino. The 525th Fighter-Bomber Squadron figured prominently in these battles, providing air support to Allied ground forces.

In 1944, the 525th transitioned to the Republic P-47 Thunderbolt. Along with the new aircraft the 525th was redesignated the 525th Fighter Squadron on 30 May 1944. In February 1945, the squadron moved to Tatonville Airfield, France, to fly missions against Germany. Two months later it moved into Germany, establishing its headquarters at Braunshardt Airfield on 18 April 1945. The 525th flew its last combat mission on 8 May 1945, and postwar the headquarters moved to AAF Station Schweinfurt on 23 October 1945.

Cold War
The 525th moved to Bolling Field, District of Columbia on 23 October 1945, as it awaited the realignment of U.S. Forces under the Status of Forces Agreements at the end of World War II. The 525thwas temporarily inactivated on 31 March 1946.

It was reactivated on 20 August 1946, at AAF Station Nordholz, Germany, again flying the P-47 Thunderbolt. The squadron made three more moves in Germany; to Lechfeld Air Base on 13 November 1946, Bad Kissingen Air Base on 5 March 1947, and then to Neubiberg Air Base on 12 June 1947, where the squadron was the closest operational Air Force unit to the Iron Curtain. On 20 January 1950, the 525th Fighter Squadron was redesignated the 525th Fighter-Bomber Squadron. In October 1950, the squadron transitioned to its first jet aircraft, the Republic F-84E Thunderjet and operated under the Mutual Defense Assistance Program. As a part of MDAP, the 525th trained pilots and ground crews of many European and Middle Eastern countries.

The 525th moved to Landstuhl Air Base, Germany on 20 November 1952, where it transitioned to the North American F-86 Sabre. The F-86 was Europe's first all-weather fighter-interceptor, and the 86th Fighter Group was the first to fly it in Europe. The 525th first flew the F-86F Sabre on 14 April 1953. Flying the F-86 in the air defense role, the 525th was redesignated as the 525th Fighter-Interceptor Squadron on 9 August 1954.

In 1957, the squadrons of the 86th Group were dispersed throughout Europe to provide better air defense coverage and reduce vulnerability to attack. On 12 February 1957, the squadron moved to Bitburg Air Base, Germany. The 525th was the only squadron at Bitburg to maintain air defense alert for the next 20 years.

The 525th received its first Convair F-102 Delta Dagger in February 1959 and was selected to represent the U.S. Air Forces in Europe (USAFE) at the 1959 William Tell competition. Although new to its aircraft, the 525th took the lead in the competition and held it until the last event when it was nosed out by a few points.

In 1965, 1967, and 1971 the 525th was chosen as the Sector III representative to the NATO Air Superiority Competitions. In each competition, the squadron made an outstanding showing, winning the Guynemer Trophy for the best sector performance in 1971.

The 525th became part of the 36th Tactical Fighter Wing on 1 November 1968. On 1 October 1969, the squadron was redesignated the 525th Tactical Fighter Squadron. Still maintaining two aircraft on 24-hour air defense alert status, the 525th's new mission now included close air support and limited nuclear air-to-ground delivery. Additionally, on 16 November 1969, the 525th became the first squadron in Germany to fly the McDonnell Douglas F-4E Phantom II. The 525th was subsequently nominated by USAFE for the Hughes Trophy in 1969.

In 1970 and 1971, the 525th was awarded the Allied Forces Central Europe Scroll of Honor. This award for "outstanding operational achievement" was given for twice consecutively earning the rating of "1" on tactical evaluations by Allied Air Forces Central Europe. In 1974, the 525th was nominated by USAFE again for the Hughes Trophy, and received a commendable citation in a close finals competition. That year the squadron established Dissimilar Air Combat Tactics (DACT) training with the Northrop F-5 Tiger II aggressor squadron at RAF Alconbury, England. Later, the squadron was the first in USAFE to establish DACT programs with non-aggressor and non-USAF adversaries. The 525th was chosen to be the first squadron in Europe to fly the McDonnell Douglas F-15 Eagle.

525th pilots flew the first 23 F-15 Eagles to Europe on 27 April 1977 during a non-stop deployment from Langley Air Force Base, Virginia, to Bitburg. Operation Ready Eagle became a success when, 18 hours after arrival at Bitburg, the squadron's pilots were sitting five-minute alert status with two of the F-15s. After less than one month on station, the Bulldogs were declared Europe's first operationally ready F-15 squadron on 26 May 1977.

In 1978, the 525th was featured as part of the McDonnell Douglas film, "Eagles in Defense of Europe." In October 1979, the 525th flew the first training missions at the new Air Combat Maneuvering Instrumentation range at Decimomannu Air Base, Sardinia, Italy. In 1984, the squadron participated in an exchange with the French Air Force, sending six F-15s to Orange-Caritat Air Base, France, in exchange for four Mirage F-1 aircraft. The French pilots flew for several weeks with the 525th and operated out of its operations facilities at Bitburg. In 1986, and again in 1987, the 525th deployed to Morocco and set up bare base operations at Sidi Slimane Air Base. The 525th lived and functioned for four weeks out of tents and flew its missions with Mirage F-1 and F-5 aircraft from Morocco. In November 1988, the 525th won USAFE's Excalibur air-to-air weapons competition. In April 1989, the squadron set a wing record for the most sorties in one month, flying 678 sorties, with 14 aircraft, while deployed to Decimomannu Air Base, Italy.

Gulf War
In August 1990, Iraqi military forces attacked and occupied the nation of Kuwait, precipitating the Gulf War. As a result, the 525th deployed to Incirlik Air Base, Turkey, in December 1990. When the squadron arrived at Incirlik it joined General Dynamics F-16 Fighting Falcons from Spain, General Dynamics F-111 Aardvarks from England, Wild Weasels from Germany, Boeing KC-135 Stratotankers from Texas, and Boeing E-3 Sentry and other electronic combat support aircraft from around the world. These units, deployed to Incirlik Air Base, formed the 7440th Combat Wing (Provisional).

On the night of 17 January 1991, the squadron flew its first strike against Iraq. On 19 January 1991, two 525th pilots used AIM-7 Sparrow radar missiles to destroy two Iraqi Mirage F-1s. During the next six weeks, until the cease-fire, the 525th flew around the clock, protecting two strikes per day and one strike each night. These strikes targeted military airfields, nuclear and chemical facilities, communications centers, power plants, and oil refineries and storage facilities in northern Iraq. By the middle of February, the 525th was attacking Baghdad. In addition to protecting strike aircraft, the 525th was frequently tasked to man barrier Combat Air Patrols in eastern Iraq to destroy Iraqi fighters attempting to flee to Iran. These missions, often lasting in excess of five hours, required the squadron to operate more than 150 miles behind enemy lines without any support assets.

The squadron flew 1,329 combat sorties for a total of 3,550 combat hours during operations against Iraq. The squadron shot down six enemy aircraft without losing any of its own aircraft. On 13 March 1991, the 525th returned to Bitburg. The squadron deployed back to Incirlik AB on 5 April 1991 to support Operation Provide Comfort.

Following the war against Iraq, numerous Kurdish refugees fled northward from the remaining forces of Saddam Hussein. The United States initiated Operation Provide Comfort, to drop food and supplies to these refugees concentrated in Iraq along the Turkish border. Because tensions between the Iraqi and Allied forces in the area remained quite high, the 525th was called back to Turkey in April 1991 to protect the vulnerable Allied cargo aircraft. In addition, the 525th was tasked, as part of the operation, to fly at low altitude over Iraq and provide intelligence updates of Iraqi troop and equipment locations.

Between 5 April and 25 May 1991, the 525th flew 285 sorties over Iraq in support of Operation Provide Comfort without a single Allied aircraft being lost in Iraq due to hostile fire.

Recent Events
The 525th deployed to Leeuwarden Air Base, Netherlands, during October 1991. In December 1991, the Bulldogs deployed to RAF Bentwaters, England, to train on the new North Sea Air Combat Maneuvering Instrumentation range. The final weapons training deployment for the 525th was at Leeuwarden Air Base, Netherlands, from 16–27 March 1992.

The 525th inactivated at Bitburg AB on 1 April 1992. After 15 years of inactivation, Pacific Air Forces activated the 525th Fighter Squadron at Elmendorf Air Force Base, Alaska, on 29 October 2007. The 525th Fighter Squadron is now armed with the Air Force's newest fighter aircraft, the Lockheed Martin F-22 Raptor.

Lineage
 Constituted as the 309th Bombardment Squadron (Light) on 13 January 1942
 Activated on 10 February 1942
 Redesignated 309th Bombardment Squadron (Dive) on 3 September 1942
 Redesignated 525th Fighter-Bomber Squadron on 23 August 1943
 Redesignated 525th Fighter Squadron on 30 May 1944
 Inactivated on 31 March 1946
 Activated on 20 August 1946
 Redesignated 525th Fighter-Bomber Squadron on 20 January 1950
 Redesignated 525th Fighter-Interceptor Squadron on 9 August 1954
 Redesignated 525th Tactical Fighter Squadron on 1 October 1969
 Inactivated on 31 March 1992
 Redesignated 525th Fighter Squadron on 18 September 2007
 Activated on 30 September 2007

Assignments
 86th Bombardment Group (later 86th Fighter-Bomber Group, 86th Fighter Group), 10 February 1942 – 31 March 1946
 86th Fighter Group (later 86th Composite Group, 86th Fighter Group, 86th Fighter-Bomber Group, 86th Fighter-Interceptor Group), 20 August 1946 (attached to 86th Fighter-Interceptor Wing, 22 May 1954 – 7 October 1955 and after 10 August 1956)
 86th Fighter-Interceptor Wing (later 86th Air Division), 8 March 1958
 36th Tactical Fighter Wing (later 36th Fighter Wing), 1 November 1968 – 31 March 1992
 3d Operations Group, 30 September 2007 – present

Stations

 Will Rogers Field, Oklahoma, 10 February 1942
 Hunter Field, Georgia, c. 22 June 1942
 Key Field, Mississippi, c. 7 August 1942
 Camp Kilmer, New Jersey, 22 March–28 April 1943
 La Senia Airfield, Algeria, 11 May 1943
 Marnia Airfield, French Morocco, 3 June 1943
 Tafaraoui Airfield, Algeria, 11 June 1943
 Korba Airfield, Tunisia, 30 June 1943
 Gela Airfield, Sicily, Italy, 21 July 1943
 Barcellona Landing Ground, Sicily, Italy, 27 August 1943
 Sele Airfield, Italy, 22 September 1943
 Serretella Airfield, Italy, 12 October 1943
 Pomigliano Airfield, Italy, 19 November 1943
 Marcianise Airfield, Italy, 30 April 1944
 Ciampino Airport, Italy, c. 12 June 1944
 Orbetello Airfield, Italy, c. 19 June 1944
 Poretta Airfield, Corsica, France, c. 12 July 1944

 Grosseto Airfield, Italy, c. 17 September 1944
 Pisa Airport, Italy, 6 November 1944
 Tatonville Airfield (Y-1), France, 20 February 1945
 Braunshardt Airfield (Y-72), Germany, c. 17 April 1945
 AAF Station Schweinfurt, Germany (R-25), 26 September 1945 – 15 February 1946
 Bolling Field, Washington, D.C., 15 February – 31 March 1946
 AAF Station Nordholz, Germany, 20 August 1946
 AAF Station Lechfeld, Germany c. 14 November 1946
 AAF Station Bad Kissingen, Germany, 5 March 1947
 Neubiberg Air Base, Germany, 12 June 1947
 Deployed at Munich-Riem Air Base, Germany, July-7 August 1948
 Deployed at Giebelstadt Air Base, Germany, 20 May – 3 August 1951
 Landstuhl Air Base (later Ramstein Air Base), Germany, 9 August 1952
 Bitburg Air Base, Germany, 12 February 1957 – 31 March 1992
 Elmendorf AFB, AK, 30 September 2007 – present

Aircraft

 Douglas A-20 Havoc, 1942
 Vultee A-31 Vengeance, 1942
 North American A-36 Apache, 1942–1944
 Curtiss P-40 Warhawk, 1944
 Republic P-47 Thunderbolt, 1944–1946; 1946–1950
 Republic F-84 Thunderjet, 1950–1953

 North American F-86 Sabre, 1953–1959
 Convair F-102 Delta Dagger, 1959–1969
 McDonnell Douglas F-4 Phantom II, 1969–1977
 McDonnell Douglas F-15 Eagle, 1977–1991
 Lockheed Martin F-22 Raptor 2007 – present

References

Notes
 Explanatory notes

 Citations

Bibliography

  (subscription required for web access)

External links
 525th Fighter Squadron Fact Sheet

525
Military units and formations in Alaska
Fighter squadrons of the United States Army Air Forces